= Thompson Square (Charlestown, Boston) =

Park in Charlestown, Boston, Massachusetts, U.S.

- Location within Boston
- Location: Charlestown, Massachusetts
- Coordinates: 42°22′30.6″N 71°3′50.3″W

Thompson Square is a .17-acre (0.069 ha) park in Boston's Charlestown neighborhood, in the U.S. state of Massachusetts.
